Stasio is a village in the municipal unit of Kyparissia, Greece. In 2011 its population was 160. It is 4 km south of Kyparissia. The church in the village is St. Michael's and Gabriel's.

Populated places in Messenia